Glutathione peroxidase 7 is an enzyme that in humans is encoded by the GPX7 gene.

References

Further reading

External links 
 PDBe-KB provides an overview of all the structure information available in the PDB for Human Glutathione peroxidase 7

EC 1.11.1